(You Shepherd of Israel, hear), 104, is a church cantata by Johann Sebastian Bach. He composed it for the second Sunday after Easter in Leipzig and first performed it on 23 April 1724.

History and words 
Bach composed the cantata in his first annual cycle in Leipzig for the second Sunday after Easter, called  The prescribed readings for that Sunday were from the First Epistle of Peter, Christ as a model, and from the Gospel of John, the Good Shepherd. In the second recitative, he concludes: "Only gather, o good Shepherd, us poor and erring ones; ah, let our journey soon reach an end and lead us into your sheepfold!" The last aria hopes "for faith's reward after a gentle sleep of death" (des Glaubens Lohn nach einem sanften Todesschlafe), combining the Baroque ideas of pastoral peace and longing for death.

Bach first performed the cantata on 23 April 1724.

Scoring and structure 
The cantata in six movements is scored for tenor and bass soloists, a four-part choir, two oboes (No.s 1 & 6), two oboes d'amore (No.s 3 & 5), taille (tenor oboe), two violins, viola and basso continuo.

 Chorus: 
 Recitative (tenor): 
 Aria (tenor): 
 Recitative (bass): 
 Aria (bass): 
 Chorale:

Music 

Bach referred to the pastoral aspect of the text in his music. In the opening chorus, three oboes on the firm ground of extended pedal point create pastoral sounds, in triplets which are frequently associated with shepherds, such as in the Sinfonia opening Part II of Bach's Christmas Oratorio. The choir sings alternating homophonic calls, "höre!" (listen!) and "erscheine!" (appear!), and two fugues on the image of Joseph leading his flocks. The fugue subject is the same in both fugues, but the second time the voices enter from the lowest voice to the highest, culminating in an ultimate third section of the calls. Different from the normal setting, the instrumental introduction is not repeated after this climax.

The first recitative leads to an arioso part on the final Bible quotation "" (God is faithful). The tenor aria is accompanied by two oboes d'amore. In the bass aria, instrumentation, triplets and extended pedal points are reminiscent of the opening chorus. The closing choral is a four-part setting on the tune of "".

Recordings 
 Les Grandes Cantates de J.S. Bach Vol. 2, Fritz Werner, Heinrich-Schütz-Chor Heilbronn, Southwest German Radio Symphony Orchestra, Helmut Krebs, Franz Kelch, Erato 1957
 Les Grandes Cantates de J.S. Bach Vol. 2, Fritz Werner, Heinrich-Schütz-Chor Heilbronn, Pforzheim Chamber Orchestra, Kurt Huber, Jakob Stämpfli, Erato 1966
 Bach Cantatas Vol. 2 – Easter, Karl Richter, Münchener Bach-Chor, Münchener Bach-Orchester, Peter Schreier, Dietrich Fischer-Dieskau, Archiv Produktion 1973
 J. S. Bach: Das Kantatenwerk – Sacred Cantatas Vol. 6, Nikolaus Harnoncourt, Tölzer Knabenchor, Concentus Musicus Wien, Kurt Equiluz, Philippe Huttenlocher, Teldec 1980
 J. S. Bach: Complete Cantatas Vol. 6, Ton Koopman, Amsterdam Baroque Orchestra & Choir, Paul Agnew, Klaus Mertens, Antoine Marchand 2000
 Bach Edition Vol. 4 – Cantatas Vol. 9, Pieter Jan Leusink, Holland Boys Choir, Netherlands Bach Collegium, Knut Schoch, Bas Ramselaar, Brilliant Classics 2000
 Bach Cantatas Vol. 23: Arnstadt/Echternach, John Eliot Gardiner, Monteverdi Choir, English Baroque Soloists, Norbert Meyn, Stephen Varcoe, Soli Deo Gloria 2000
 J. S. Bach: Cantatas Vol. 19 (Cantatas from Leipzig 1724), Masaaki Suzuki, Bach Collegium Japan, Makoto Sakurada, Stephan MacLeod, BIS 2001
 Bachvespern Frankfurt/Wiesbaden Mitschnitte aus den Gottesdiensten Frühjahr 2005, Martin Lutz, Kantorei St. Katharinen, Bach-Collegium Frankfurt/Wiesbaden, Georg Poplutz, Markus Flaig, Bachvespern Frankfurt/Wiesbaden 2005

References

Sources 
 
 Du Hirte Israel, höre BWV 104; BC A 65 / Sacred cantata (3rd Sunday of Easter) Bach Digital
 Cantata BWV 104 Du Hirte Israel, höre: history, scoring, sources for text and music, translations to various languages, discography, discussion, Bach Cantatas Website
 BWV 104 Du Hirte Israel, höre: English translation, University of Vermont
 
 Luke Dahn: BWV 104.6 bach-chorales.com

External links 
 Du Hirte Israel, höre, BWV 104: performance by the Netherlands Bach Society (video and background information)

Church cantatas by Johann Sebastian Bach
1724 compositions
Psalm-related compositions by Johann Sebastian Bach